Single-pen architecture and double-pen architecture are architectural styles for design of log, and sometimes stone or brick pioneer houses found in the United States.  A single pen is just one unit:  a rectangle of four walls of a log cabin.  In double pen architecture, two log pens are built and those are joined by a roof over a breezeway in between. A saddlebag house is a subset of double-pen architecture with two rooms, a central chimney, and one or two front doors.

See also
Dog trot architecture
Central-passage house
Slave pen

References

Architectural styles
 
 
Log buildings and structures in the United States